Károly Antal Than de Apát – also called as Carl von Than – (20 December 1834 – 5 July 1908) was a Hungarian chemist who discovered carbonyl sulfide in 1867.

Life
AKároly Than was born in Óbecse, Kingdom of Hungary, Austrian Empire (today Bečej, Serbia). His mother was Otillia Setényi. He interrupted his education and joined the Hungarian army in the war of independence 1848 at the age of 14. On his return, he found his mother dead and his father ruined. Than worked in several pharmacies to earn money form completing his education. After attending a school in Szeged, Than started to study medicine and later chemistry at the University of Vienna. He received his PhD for work with Josef Redtenbacher in 1858. After working for some time as assistant of Redtenbacher, he left to study with Robert Bunsen at the University of Heidelberg and with Charles-Adolphe Wurtz at the University of Paris. On his return to Redtenbacher in 1859, he worked as lecturer at the University of Vienna.

The University of Budapest was in need of Hungarian-speaking professors due to a change from German to Hungarian teaching language in 1860. Theodor Wertheim changed to the University of Graz and Than was offered the vacant position which he occupied until his retirement in 1908. Than married in 1872 and had five children. He published the first Hungarian chemistry journal (Magyar Chémiai Folyóirat) and was the president of the Hungarian Society of Natural Science from 1872 until his death. He was made baron in 1908, and died, suddenly, the same year.

Discovery of carbonyl sulfide
Than was aware of existence of the two compounds carbon dioxide (CO2) and carbon disulfide (CS2) and so he tried to synthesize COS. In his first experiments he reacted carbon monoxide (CO) with sulfur. The reaction yielded some product which Than was unable to purify. The second approach to create the COS was by hydrolysis of thiocyanic acid. The reaction of potassium thiocyanate and sulfuric acid yielded a gas containing significant amount of byproducts (HCN, H2O and CS2) and required purification.
KSCN + 2 H2SO4 + H2O → KHSO4 + NH4HSO4 + COS

Than was able to characterize most of the properties of carbonyl sulfide and also tried to determine the chemical reactions of carbonyl sulfide. For these achievements, he received the Lieben Prize in 1868.

References

1834 births
1908 deaths
Hungarian chemists
Hungarian scientists
University of Vienna alumni